The  was one of the ministries in the Japanese government.

The ministry introduced the POSIVA system for giving aid to foreign countries in January 1991.

In January 2001, the ministry was merged with other ministries to form the Ministry of Internal Affairs and Communications. The Postal Services Agency, under the new ministry, continued the POSIVA program.

References

External links
 
  

Posts and Telecommunications
1946 establishments in Japan
2001 disestablishments in Japan
Communications ministries